Dragoslav "Dragan" Nikolić (20 August 1943 – 11 March 2016) was a Yugoslav and later, Serbian actor.

Nikolić studied at Dramatic Arts Academy in Belgrade. In 1967 he starred in the film Kad budem mrtav i beo, which was the beginning of a career that lasted 50 years. Dragan Nikolić has since appeared in many films of different genres and portrayed various characters, becoming one of the most  recognizable actors in Serbian cinema. In 2000, he received the "Pavle Vuisić" Award for his lifework. From 2011 to 2013, he was the television host on the Serbian edition of quiz Who Wants to Be a Millionaire?.

His best known role was as Prle, a wisecracking World War II resistance fighter whom he portrayed in 1970s TV series Otpisani and Povratak otpisanih.

Personal life

His wife was the Serbian actress, Milena Dravić. They co-hosted the 1970s TV variety show Obraz uz obraz (Cheek to cheek).

Selected filmography

References

External links

 

1943 births
2016 deaths
Serbian male film actors
Serbian male television actors
Yugoslav male film actors
Golden Arena winners
Male actors from Belgrade
20th-century Serbian male actors
21st-century Serbian male actors
Deaths from colorectal cancer